Agustín Acosta may refer to:
 Agustín Acosta (baseball)
 Agustín Acosta (footballer)
 Agustín Acosta (poet)